Scott Robinson (born April 27, 1959) is an American jazz multi-instrumentalist. Robinson is best known for his work on multiple saxophones, but he has also performed on clarinet, alto clarinet, flute, trumpet, sarrusophone, and other, more obscure instruments.

Music career
The son of a piano teacher and National Geographic book editor, Robinson graduated from the Berklee College of Music in 1981. The next year, he joined the college's staff, becoming its youngest faculty member.

Robinson has appeared on more than 275 LP and CD releases, including 20 under his leadership, with musicians Frank Wess, Roscoe Mitchell, Ruby Braff, Joe Lovano, Ron Carter, Paquito D'Rivera, David Bowie, Maria Schneider, Rufus Reid, Buck Clayton, and the Orchestra of St. Luke's. Four of these recordings won a Grammy Award. He has received four fellowships from the National Endowment for the Arts.

In 2000, the U.S. State Department named him a jazz ambassador for the year 2001, funding a tour of West Africa in which he played the early works of Louis Armstrong. Material from these appearances was released on the album Jazz Ambassador: Scott Robinson Plays the Compositions of Louis Armstrong by Arbors Records.

Throughout his career, Robinson has worked to keep unusual and obscure instruments in the public view. For example, he has recorded an album featuring the C-melody saxophone and performs with the ophicleide. He also owns and records with a vintage contrabass saxophone so rare that fewer than twenty in playable condition are known to exist.

Since 2009, he has operated his record label, ScienSonic Laboratories.

Select discography

As leader/co-leader
 Multiple Instruments (Multijazz, 1984)
 Winds of Change (Multijazz, 1990)
 Magic Eye (Bliss, 1993)
 Thinking Big (Arbors, 1997)
 Melody from the Sky (Arbors, 2000)
 Summertime (Cube Bohemia, 2004)
 Jazz Ambassador (Arbors, 2004)
 Forever Lasting (Arbors, 2008) 
 Live at Space Farms (ScienSonic, 2010)
 Nucleus (ScienSonic, 2010)
 Bronze Nemesis (Doc-tone/ScienSonic, 2012)
 Mission In Space (ScienSonic, 2014)
 ? (ScienSonic, 2015)
 Heliosonic Toneways (ScienSonic, 2017)
 Tenormore (Arbors, 2019)
 Flow States (ScienSonic, 2020)

As sideman or guest
With Ruby Braff
 1997 Ruby Braff Remembers Louis Armstrong: Being With You 
 2002 Variety Is the Spice of Braff
 2010 Our Love Is Here to Stay

With John Fedchock
 1992 New York Big Band 
 1998 On the Edge
 2002 No Nonsense

With Marty Grosz
 1994 Keep a Song in Your Soul 
 1996 The Rhythm for Sale
 2005 Chasin' the Spots
 2006 Marty Grosz and His Hot Combination
 2009 Hot Winds: The Classic Sessions
 2012 The James P. Johnson Songbook

With Keith Ingham
 1994 The Keith Ingham New York 9, Vol. 1 
 1994 The Keith Ingham New York 9, Vol. 2
 1998 A Mellow Bit of Rhythm
 1999 A Star Dust Melody
 2001 Keith Ingham New York 9, Vol. 3
With Frank Kimbrough
 2018 Monk's Dreams: The Complete Compositions of Thelonious Sphere Monk (Sunnyside)
With Frank Mantooth
 1989 Suite Tooth 
 1993 Dangerous Precedent
 1999 Miracle

With Bob Mintzer
 1990 The Art of the Big Band 
 2000 Homage to Count Basie
 2006 Old School New Lessons

With John Pizzarelli
 1991 All of Me
 1993 Naturally
 1994 New Standards
 1997 Our Love Is Here to Stay
With the Joe Roccisano Orchestra
Leave Your Mind Behind (Landmark, 1995)
With Randy Sandke
 1990 Stampede 
 1993 The Bix Beiderbecke Era
 1994 Chase
 1995 Calling All Cats 
 2000 Re-Discovered Louis & Bix
 2002 Randy Sandke Meets Bix Beiderbecke
 2002 Inside Out
 2005 Outside In

With Maria Schneider
 1992 Evanescence 
 1995 Coming About
 2000 Allegresse
 2000 Days of Wine and Roses - Live at the Jazz Standard
 2004 Concert in the Garden
 2013 Winter Morning Walks
 2015 The Thompson Fields
 2020 Data Lords

With John Sheridan
 2005 Easy as It Gets
 2007 Swing Is Still the King
 2010 Hooray for Christmas!

With others
 1985 Live at Chan's, Rebecca Parris
 1993 Saxophone Mosaic, Gary Smulyan
 1993 Tryin' to Make My Blues Turn Green, Frank Wess
 1993 What Matters Most, Tom Postilio
 1994 Black Brown & Beige, Louie Bellson
 1994 Caecilie Norby, Cæcilie Norby
 1994 I Saw Stars, Rebecca Kilgore
 1996 Bufadora Blow-Up, Bob Wilber
 1996 Look What I Found, Daryl Sherman
 1996 Strings Attached, Peter Ecklund
 1997 Live at MCG, Paquito D'Rivera
 1997 Song for My Mother, Walt Weiskopf
 1999 Last Swing of the Century, Ken Peplowski
 1999 Joyful Noise: A Tribute to Duke Ellington, Don Sebesky
 1999 New Works Celebration, Bob Brookmeyer
 1999 Out of This World, Loren Schoenberg
 2000 Being a Bear: Jazz for the Whole Family, Dan Barrett
 2000 Noumena, Frank Kimbrough
 2000 Sultry Serenade, James Chirillo
 2001 Ballad Essentials, Carol Sloane
 2001 Black Dahlia, Bob Belden
 2001 Dear Louis, Nicholas Payton
 2001 Group Therapy, Jim McNeely
 2001 L' Instant d'Apres, David Linx
 2001 Play It Cool, Lea DeLaria
 2001 Sweet & Lowdown, Dave Van Ronk
 2003 On This Day at the Vanguard, Joe Lovano
 2006 Tiger by the Tail, George Gruntz
 2011 Ron Carter's Great Big Band, Ron Carter
 2013 Joyride, Cynthia Sayer
 2014 Nothing Has Changed, David Bowie
 2014 Quiet Pride: The Elizabeth Catlett Project, Rufus Reid
 2018 Monk's Dreams: The Complete Compositions of Thelonious Sphere Monk (Sunnyside, 2018), Frank Kimbrough

References

External links
 ScienSonic Laboratories

1959 births
Living people
People from Teaneck, New Jersey
Berklee College of Music alumni
American jazz saxophonists
American male saxophonists
Sarrusophone players
21st-century American saxophonists
Towson University faculty
21st-century American male musicians
American male jazz musicians
Mingus Big Band members
Arbors Records artists